Virtual High School may refer to:

Franklin Virtual High School
Michigan Virtual High School
Virtual High School (Ontario)